This article lists the world's busiest container ports (ports with container terminals that specialize in handling goods transported in intermodal shipping containers), by total number of twenty-foot equivalent units (TEUs) transported through the port. The table lists volume in thousands of TEU per year. The vast majority of containers moved by large, ocean-faring container ships, are 20-foot (1 TEU), and 40-foot (2 TEU) ISO-standard shipping containers, with 40-foot units outnumbering 20-foot units to such an extent, that the actual number of containers moved is between 55%–60% of the number of TEUs counted.

See also

United States container ports
List of largest container shipping companies
List of largest container ships
List of busiest ports in Europe

References

Intermodal containers
Economy-related lists of superlatives
Container Ports, Busiest
Container Ports